Pizzo is an Italian word with multiple meanings. It often means peak and hence is found in the name of numerous Italian mountains. It may also refer to

 Pizzo, Calabria, a seaport in Calabria, Italy
 Pizzo (mafia), imposed by a protection racket, a fee periodically collected by the Mafia from businesses
 Pizzo (pipe), a pipe designed for freebasing drugs
 Pizzo (surname)